The Little Locksmith is a memoir by Katharine Butler Hathaway about the effects of spinal tuberculosis on her childhood and adult life. Originally published in 1943, it was reprinted by The Feminist Press in 2000.

Pop culture
Referenced in the Gilmore Girls episode "Help Wanted".

References 

1943 American novels
Coward-McCann books